Indiana María Sánchez Sánchez (born August 3, 1987, in Managua) is a Nicaraguan model and was Miss Nicaragua 2009. Sánchez was crowned Miss Nicaragua 2009 on March 7, 2009, at the Ruben Dario National Theater in Managua. She received the crown from the outgoing Miss Nicaragua, Thelma Rodriguez. Indiana went off to represent Nicaragua at the 58th edition of the Miss Universe pageant held in August at the Atlantis Paradise Island in the Bahamas, Bahamas. She was one of the heavy favorites, appearing on many predictions list, but she did not place among the top 15. She was awarded 2nd Place in National Costume.

Sánchez was a sophomore at Miami Dade College, attending the school of Nursing. She had to put her studies on a hiatus to fulfill her duties as Miss Nicaragua 2009. After her reign as Miss Nicaragua she entered the  Nuestra Belleza Latina 2010 Reality Show aired on Univision, where she landed in 11th Place. Currently Indiana is residing in Miami where she plans to leave nursing aside and pursue a career as an actress.
Indiana will also represent Nicaragua in Reina Hispanoamericana 2010 held in Santa Cruz, Bolivia

See also
 Thelma Rodriguez
 Miss Nicaragua

References

External links
 MissNicaragua.com
 Perfil de Indiana

1987 births
Living people
People from Managua
Miss Nicaragua winners
Nicaraguan female models
Miss Universe 2009 contestants